XHRL-FM is a radio station on 98.1 FM in Monterrey, Nuevo León. The station is owned by Núcleo Radio Monterrey and carries a pop format known as Génesis 98.1.

History
XHRL received its concession on April 11, 1972.

References

Radio stations in Monterrey
Radio stations established in 1972